The Demensions are an American doo wop group from The Bronx, New York. They attended Christopher Columbus High School.  Over the years, there have been a number of lineup changes.  The group that sang on most of their earlier recordings includes Lenny Dell, Phil Del Giudice, Howie Margolin, and Marisa Martelli.

At the height of their popularity in the early 1960s, The Demensions played often in Palisades Park, New Jersey, as well as on American Bandstand and The Clay Cole Show. They also appeared at the Braniff Space Rover, known as the "Space Ship," at Freedomland U.S.A. in The Bronx. They first scored radio airplay as a result of Cousin Brucie, a disc jockey at New York radio station WINS, who began spinning their version of "Over the Rainbow". The song became a hit, peaking at No. 16 on the Billboard Hot 100 in 1960. Their only other chart hit was 1962's "My Foolish Heart", which peaked at No. 95 early in 1963.

In 1992, The Demensions (with an altered lineup) recorded again for the first time since 1963, releasing Beyond the Rainbow.

Original lead singer Lenny Dell died in 2021.

Members
Note: This list is incomplete
Lenny Dell (Original lead)
Present members:
Tom Clemente
Robin Robbert
Vinny Pizzo
Charlie Marrone (Guitar / background)
Dennis Cirolia (Drums)
Michael Banek (Bass guitar)

Previous members:
John Martinucci
Ron Scauri
Patti McTernan
Richard Carnese (Guitar)
Peter Soonarie (Bass guitar)
Dominick V. Cassano (Drums)
Uncle Phil Del Giudice (deceased)
Marisa Martelli
Howie Margolin
Charlie Peterson
Joel Reinlieb
Patrick Gamberdella (Bass guitar)

References

Official website of the Demensions

Doo-wop groups
Musical groups from the Bronx